Taza-Al Hoceima-Taounate (Berber: ⵜⴰⵣⴰ ⵜⴰⵖⵣⵓⵜ ⵜⴰⵡⵏⴰⵜ) was formerly one of the sixteen regions of Morocco from 1997 to 2015. It was situated in northern Morocco. It covered an area of 24,155 km² and had a population of 1,807,036 (2014 census). The capital was Al Hoceima.

Administrative divisions
The region was made up into the following provinces:

 Al Hoceïma Province (now part of the Tanger-Tetouan-Al Hoceima Region)
 Taounate Province (now part of the Fès-Meknès Region)
 Taza Province (now part of the Fès-Meknès Region)
 Guercif Province (since 2009; now part of the Oriental Region)

Cities

 Ajdir, Taza 
 Ajdir 
 Aknoul 
 Hoceima 
 Beni Bouayach 
 Bni Hadifa 
 Ghafsai 
 Guercif 
 Imzouren 
 Issaguen 
 Karia Ba Mohamed 
 Matmata 
 Oued Amlil 
 Oulad Zbair 
 Tahla 
 Tainaste 
 Tamassint 
 Taounate 
 Targuist 
 Taza 
 Thar Essouk 
 Tissa 
 Tizi Ouasli 
 Zrarda

Former regions of Morocco